{{DISPLAYTITLE:5-HT1D receptor agonist}}
5-HT1D receptor agonists are pharmaceutical drugs for the treatment of migraine. They include:
 Triptans (which additionally act as 5-HT1B receptor agonists)
 Ergotamine (which also has other mechanisms of action)
 Dihydroergotamine, a derivative of the former
 Alniditan

5-HT1D agonists